Kulm Hotel may refer to:

 Gornergrat Kulm Hotel, Switzerland
 Kulm Hotel St. Moritz, Switzerland

See also
 Kulm (disambiguation)